Daníel Hafsteinsson (born 12 November 1999) is an Icelandic football attacking midfielder, who plays for Knattspyrnufélag Akureyrar in Úrvalsdeild karla.

Club career

KA
Daníel started his career with local club KA in 2017, after having played 3 games with local feeder club Dalvík/Reynir in 2016. In 2018 he played 20 games for KA in Úrvalsdeild and was voted young player of the season by the club. After 12 games in the league with KA in 2019 he was sold to Helsingborgs IF for undisclosed fee on 17 July 2019.

Helsingborgs IF
He joined HIF 17 July 2019 and signed a 3.5 years contract.
Daníel made his debut for Helsingborgs IF on 29 July in a 1–4 loss against Örebro.

Knattspyrnufélag Akureyrar 
He joined KA Akureyrar on 6 February 2021.

Career statistics

References

1999 births
Living people
Daniel Hafsteinsson
Association football midfielders
Daniel Hafsteinsson
Dalvík/Reynir players
Helsingborgs IF players
Fimleikafélag Hafnarfjarðar players
Daniel Hafsteinsson
Allsvenskan players
Daniel Hafsteinsson
Daniel Hafsteinsson
Expatriate footballers in Sweden